The 2016–17 Miami hurricanes women's basketball team represented the University of Miami during the 2016–17 NCAA Division I women's basketball season. The Hurricanes, led by twelfth-year head coach Katie Meier, play their home games at the Watsco Center and are members of the Atlantic Coast Conference. They finished the season 24–9, 10–6 in ACC play to finish in sixth place. They advanced to the semifinals of the ACC women's tournament where they lost to Duke. They received an at-large bid of the NCAA women's tournament where they defeated Florida Gulf Coast in the first round before getting upset by Quinnipiac in the second round.

Roster

Media
All home games and conference road games will be broadcast on WVUM as part of the Miami Hurricanes Learfield Sports contract.

Schedule

|-
!colspan=12 style=| Non-conference Regular Season

|-
!colspan=12 style=| ACC Regular Season

|-
!colspan=12 style=| ACC Women's Tournament

|-
!colspan=12 style=| NCAA Women's Tournament

Source

Rankings

References

Miami Hurricanes women's basketball seasons
Miami
Miami